Ștefan Ciubotărașu (21 March 1910 – 27 August 1970) was a Romanian actor. He appeared in more than thirty films from 1954 to 1970.

He was born into a poor farming family in Lipovăț, Vaslui County, a village in the Moldavia region of Romania. At the age of 10–11 he was sent by his family to Bucharest to become an apprentice shoemaker. He then studied from 1929 to 1932 at the Academy of Music and Dramatic Art in Iași, after which he moved to Bârlad, where he wanted to establish himself as a theater actor. In 1934, with help from poet Mihai Codreanu, who taught at his old university and offered himself as a mentor, Ciubotărașu secured a job at the Conservatory theater in Iași. He debuted with the role of an assassin in Macbeth, and then played the role of Count Alexis Czerny in the play Ninotchka by Melchior Lengyel.

From the mid-1950s, Ciubotărașu was also cast regularly in Romanian films. Notable were his portrayal of Petre in Liviu Ciulei's drama, The Forest of the Hanged (which competed at the 1965 Cannes Film Festival), and his role as the Dacian captain Ciungul in Mircea Drăgan's historical film, The Column.

In 1964 he was awarded the Order of Culture of Merit as People's Artist of the Romanian People's Republic "for outstanding work in the field of theater, music and visual arts" and in 1967 for "a lasting and outstanding achievement in dramatic art in the theater".

Filmography

References

External links 

1910 births
1970 deaths
Romanian male film actors
People from Vaslui County
George Enescu National University of Arts alumni
Romanian male stage actors
20th-century Romanian male actors